KATN, virtual channel 2 (UHF digital channel 18), is an ABC/Fox/CW+-affiliated television station licensed to Fairbanks, Alaska, United States. Owned by Raleigh, North Carolina–based Vision Alaska LLC, the station is operated through a time brokerage agreement (TBA) by Coastal Television Broadcasting Company, LLC. KATN's studios are located in the Lathrop Building on 2nd Avenue in downtown Fairbanks, and its transmitter is located on Cranberry Ridge northeast of the city.

History

KATN debuted on March 1, 1955 as KFAR-TV, and was Fairbanks' second television station after KTVF. It became KTTU-TV (no relation to the present-day Tucson, Arizona station) on June 18, 1981 and KATN on August 18, 1984. It is now a part of the ABC Alaska Superstation and was the first TV station in Fairbanks to broadcast in color in 1967 (while KTVF was temporarily off the air due to a flood).

KFAR/KTTU was primarily an NBC station with ABC as the secondary network until 1985, when the owners of KIMO (now KYUR) in Anchorage bought the station, changed the call letters (the ATN in KATN stood for Alaska Television Network, a consortium of KATN, KIMO, and KJUD in Juneau), and made KATN the primary ABC affiliate. The station continued carrying NBC programs as a secondary affiliate until KTVF switched from CBS to NBC in 1996, in response to KATN's new ownership. Until the launch of KFXF in 1992, they were Fairbanks' only two commercial network stations.

In September 2006, KATN began to show programming from The CW (via The CW Plus) on its digital subchannel. The subchannel is called Fairbanks CW and uses the fictional call letters KWFA (the actual call letters of the subchannel are still KATN).

Smith Media sold KATN and the remainder of the "ABC Alaska's Superstation" system to Vision Alaska LLC in 2010. When the sale was completed, on May 13, 2010, Coastal Television Broadcasting Company, LLC entered into a time brokerage agreement with Vision Alaska to operate KATN and sister station KJUD.

On October 30, 2017, Fox announced that it would move its Fairbanks affiliation from KFXF-LD (channel 22) to a subchannel of KATN on November 4.

Technical information

Subchannels
The station's digital signal is multiplexed:

Conversion to digital signal
KATN shut down its analog signal, over VHF channel 2, on June 12, 2009, the official date in which full-power television stations in the United States transitioned from analog to digital broadcasts under federal mandate. The station's digital signal remained on its pre-transition UHF channel 18. Through the use of PSIP, digital television receivers display the station's virtual channel as its former VHF analog channel 2.

References

External links
 Official website

1955 establishments in Alaska
ABC network affiliates
Ion Television affiliates
Television channels and stations established in 1955
ATN